"Young Dumb & Broke" is a song by American singer Khalid Robinson. It was released as a single on June 13, 2017, by Right Hand Music Group and RCA Records as the second single from his debut studio album American Teen.

"Young Dumb & Broke" reached the top 20 on the Billboard Hot 100, peaking at number 18. Furthermore, the song peaked at number one in the Philippines and New Zealand and it has reached the top ten in Australia. As of March 2022, the single has been certified 9× Platinum by the Recording Industry Association of America, and has been streamed over one billion times on Spotify. The accompanying music video features multiple celebrity cameos, including Normani, Kel Mitchell, Wayne Brady, and Rachael Leigh Cook.

Critical reception
The Guardian's Graeme Virtue says that "More decrepit listeners might detect echoes of The Cure's 'Close to Me' amid 'Young Dumb & Broke's palliative organ spiral, but that just adds to the bittersweet vibe of taken-for-granted golden years turning to ash."

Music video
The song's accompanying music video premiered on August 1, 2017, on Khalid's Vevo account on YouTube. , the music video has over 600 million views.

The music video features cameo appearances from VanJess, Demetrius Harmon, Nathan Zed, Zolee Griggs, Salem Mitchell, Widney Bazile, Quiñ, Will Peltz, Buddy, Normani, Kel Mitchell, Wayne Brady, Rachael Leigh Cook and Dennis Haskins. Young Dumb & Broke was released as a virtual reality video for PlayStation VR on March 29, 2018.

Live performances
American rock band Imagine Dragons performed their song "Thunder" at the 2017 American Music Awards in a mash-up with "Young Dumb & Broke", with Khalid joining them for the performance. A little over a month later, on December 20, a studio version of the mash-up was released.

Chart performance
"Young Dumb & Broke" peaked at number 18 on the Billboard Hot 100 and number 17 on the UK Singles Chart. The song topped the charts in New Zealand and the Philippines and reached top 10 in Australia and Belgium. It also peaked at number one for 11 weeks on the Billboard R&B Songs chart.

Track listing

Charts

Weekly charts

Medley version

Year-end charts

Medley version

Certifications

Release history

See also
 List of 2010s number-one singles in New Zealand
Location (Khalid song)
Better (Khalid song)

References

Khalid (singer) songs
Songs written by Talay Riley
Songs written by Joel Little
2017 songs
RCA Records singles
2017 singles
Songs written by Khalid (singer)